WORD Christchurch is an organisation which presents a variety of literary events, most notably the annual WORD Christchurch Festival, also known as WORD Festival, established in 1997. Until 2014 the festival was run as the Press Christchurch Writers Festival.

About the festival
The WORD Christchurch festival is the largest literary event in the South Island of New Zealand, and partners with the Auckland Writers Festival in the North Island each year for an autumn season in May.  its directors are Steph Walker (executive director) and Nic Low (programme director). Rachael King was the literary director between 2013 and 2021. The Ngaio Marsh Awards are presented at the festival.

Until 2021, the festival was biennial. In the Festival off-year, WORD Christchurch partnered with the Christchurch Arts Festival for a series of ideas-based events, and also presented events at KidsFest in those years. It also ran an annual schools programme showcasing the New Zealand Children's Book Award finalists.

History
The Festival has run under the WORD umbrella since 2014 but was established in 1997; its predecessor was the Press Christchurch Writers Festival.

The 2018 event featured Australian writer and adventurer Robyn Davidson, former Islamist radical turned anti-extremist Ed Husain, Australian author, poet and hip-hop artist Omar Musa, British author Juno Dawson, New Zealand politician Margaret Austin, author and illustrator Gavin Bishop  and many others. On 29 November 2019 a special event was held featuring Behrouz Boochani, the award-winning Iranian-Kurdish writer and film-maker who wrote about and filmed his experiences in the Australian offshore detention camp, the Manus Island detention centre, where he was held for six years.

In September 2020, the festival was local and focussed on New Zealand writing, as the COVID-19 travel bans in New Zealand made it difficult for international authors to attend. In 2021, the festival was postponed from September to November and its programme had to be downsized, with many events being run as virtual or live-streamed, due to the ongoing impacts of the pandemic.

References

Festivals in Christchurch
Literary festivals in New Zealand